Rourkela Steel Plant (RSP), in Rourkela, Odisha is the first integrated steel plant in the public sector in India. It was set up with West Germany collaboration with an installed capacity of 1 million tonnes in the 1960s. It is operated by Steel Authority of India.

German metallurgical firms Mannesmann, Krupp, Demag, Siemens and Austrian company Voestalpine provided machinery and consultancy to the plant among others. Rourkela Steel Plant was the first steel plant in Asia to use the LD (Linz-Donawitz) process of steel-making. Rourkela Steel Plant has an associated fertilizer plant that produces nitrogeneous fertilizers using ammonia feedstock (from its coke oven plant). On 3 February 1959, then president Rajendra Prasad inaugurated RSP's first blast furnace named 'Parvati' when the company was known as Hindustan Steel Limited (HSL). Subsequently, the RSP became a unit of the (SAIL). Ahmed ulla .. Was the chief engineer appointed by Germans to facilitate the project, at start.

History

The agreement was signed in Bonn, Germany by the Secretary of the Ministry of Production, on behalf of the Government of India, and two German firms of international repute, namely Krupp and Demag. The agreement provides for the technical and financial participation of these two firms in the construction of a new steel plant with an initial capacity of half a million tons of ingots, capable of expansion to one million tons.

The capital cost of the project is estimated to be about Rs. 71-25 crores at that time money. The share capital to be contributed by the German collaborators is expected to be of the order of Rs. 9.5 crores, the exact amount depending on the value of the plant that they may supply, and the balance of share capital will be found by the Government of India. It is proposed, however, to apply to the International Bank for Development and Reconstruction for a loan of about Rs. 20 crores towards the capital cost.

The German investment be for a period of about 10 years, with option to either side to continue the association for a further period of 10 years. Global tenders for supplies will be Invited and quality, prices and deliveries of plant will be the determining factors in selecting the suppliers. The German Combine will be appointed the technical consultants and will receive a fixed fee of about Rs. 2.10 crores, which works out to about 3 per cent, on the estimated cost No royalties are payable and no bonus shares will be issued The management of the company will be vested in a board, in which the Government and the Combine will have representation proportionate to their respective investments. The
Chairman and the managing director will be the nominees of Government, thereby reserving to Government the control and overall management of this vital industry. The German Combine will recommend a team of technical experts for the efficient working of the plant. The number of Germans to be employed will be kept down to the minimum commensurate with the requirements of efficiency. Indians will receive, meanwhile specialised training for the progressive replacement of German nationals.

The German collaborators expect that the plant could be commissioned within a period of four years after the preliminary details have been settled, A representative team is expected in India in September to discuss and settle the constitution of a Company and to make specific recommendations on the location of the plant etc. The over-riding consideration for location be the economics of production and of distribution and the site will be selected with these In view After a careful assessment of the requirements for steel with the growing industrialisation of the country, Government have come to the conclusion that there still exists the need for the establishment of another unit after providing for the expansion of the present project. To this end, necessary planning and other action will be initiated. The German firms of Krupp Sc Demag with whom we had arrived at an agreement, would be asked to tender their advice on the location of the plant, its design, erection and operation. Accordingly, the technical experts of the German firms visited the states of Bihar, West Bengal, Madhya Pradesh and Orissa and studied earlier technical reports and the memoranda submitted by these governments. They collected additional data, inspected the proposed sites, and held discussions with the governments as well as with the central authorities concerned. After a study and assessment of the material so collected, both here and in association with their top technical experts in Germany, they have recommended the location of the new steel plant at Rourkela in Orissa. The Government of India has very carefully examined this recommendation. They have considered the views of the Governments of Madhya Pradesh, West Bengal and Orissa, on the report of the consultants. They have also had the benefit of discussions with the chief ministers of Madhya Pradesh and West Bengal and two ministers of Orissa. Having taken into consideration all the factors and the data available, the Government of India has come to the conclusion that the recommendation of their consultants in regard to the location of this plant at Rourkela should be accepted. The Government of India has also decided that a further intensive survey, examination and analysis of the mineral resources around, with particular reference to iron ore and coal, to facilitate the economic and industrial development of these resources.

Recently, 12,000-crore rupees modernisation and expansion project was dedicated to the Nation by Prime minister Narendra Modi on 1 April 2015. With this RSP presently has the capacity to produce 4.5 million tonnes of hot metal, 4.2 million tonnes of crude steel and 3.9 million tonnes of saleable steel. The capacity of Rourkela Steel Plant (RSP) is expected to rise to 10.8 MTPA by 2025.

Upgrade & Modernization 

The RSP has many firsts to its credit. It is the first plant in Asia to adopt the energy-efficient LD process of steel making and the first integrated steel plant of SAIL which adopted the cost-effective and quality centered continuous casting route to process 100% of steel produced. The plant has also, for the first time in India, had adopted external desulphurisation of hot metal by calcium carbide injection process. RSP is one of the unique units under the SAIL umbrella with a wide variety of special purpose steels. After RSP was set up with the help of German collaboration. Subsequently, its steel making capacity was enhanced to 2 million tonnes and added many units to the facility. A pipe plant and special plate plant were set up during the 1970s for production of ERW pipes and steel plates for defense requirements. NSPCL, a joint venture company of NTPC Limited and SAIL, set up a captive power plant of 120 MW capacity to be self-sufficient. Rourkela Steel Plant undertook a modernization program in 1988 with an outlay of INR 4500 crores. This revamped the process of supply of raw materials, new oxygen plant, improved techniques in blast furnaces, selling of dolomite plant, cast house, slag granulation plant, supply of raw materials sintering plants and coal handling plants among others. Following the modernization RSP became the first SAIL plant to have adopted continuous casting route for all its hot metal production. It is also the first Indian steel plant to have adopted external desulfurisation of hot metal by the calcium carbide injection process.

Steel Authority of India plans to invest for its capacity expansion in its major plants. So Rourkela Steel Plant on modernization and expansion project on process.

 1964: The Fertilizer Plant was set up in the year 1964 with a view to utilizing the residue of the steel plant and the re-utilization of the chemicals. 
 1970: Pipe Plant and Special Plate Plant was set up for production of pipes and steel plates for defense requirements.
 1988: The modernization of RSP was begun for producing qualitative materials and establishing its importance in the world market.
 1998: The modernization program with an outlay of INR 4500 crores. 
 2010: RSP-SAIL plans for its capacity expansion in its existing 2.2 MT to 4.5 MT of production.
 2013: Rourkela Steel Plant unveiled the country's largest blast furnace named "DURGA" having a useful volume of 4060 cubic metres with a production capacity of 8000 tons hot metal per day, thus increasing its production capacity from 2.2 MT to 4.5 MT.
 2015:Rourkela Steel Plant has set up 1 MW solar photovoltaic (PV) power generation unit inside the plant premises at a cost of Rs 6.68 crore, is expected to generate minimum 1.479 million units of solar energy per annum.
It is also installing other facilities for production of green energy. Two 5 KW rooftop solar PV power generation systems have already been installed and seven more such systems are in the pipeline. RSP is also in the process of setting up a 15 MW hydro power project on the downstream of Mandira Dam in collaboration with GEDCOL.

Product mix 
SAIL's Rourkela Steel Plant is a unique unit under SAIL with a wide variety of special purpose steels. The use of its products abound. Its HR coils find application in manufacturing LPG cylinders, automobiles, railway wagon chassis and other high-strength type steels. It is SAIL's only plant that produces silicon steels for the power sector, high quality pipes for the oil and gas sector and tin plates for the packaging industry. Its wide and sophisticated product range includes flat, tubular and coated products. Special Plate Plant, Rourkela, is emerging as a major special steels centre for defence equipment. It produces armoured plate for the T-90 and Arjun (tank), and the BMP-2 infantry combat vehicle, which are built at Avadi and Medak respectively by the Ordnance Factory Board. Its annual capacity of 2,000 tonnes is being upped to 12,000 tonnes. The AB/A grade steel used in making India's first fully home made Aircraft carrier INS Vikrant (2013) were produced in Rourkela Steel Plant.

Products
 Plate Mill plates
 HR plates and coils
 Defence grade plates
 ERW pipes
 SW pipes
 Galvanized Corrugated and Galvanised plain sheets
 Chequered plates and coils
 Electrical steel (CRNO)

Achievements 

 Two groups of employees receives the coveted Vishwakarma Rashrtriya Puaraskar by the Ministry of Labour and Employment, Government of India. 
 Four departments of RSP got certified with the prestigious ISO 50001:2018 EMS (energy management system) for the first time. The Certificate was awarded by Messers Bureau Veritas India, Limited (M/s BVIL), Kolkata. 
 RSP bagged the prestigious ‘Gold award’ for ‘Internal Communication Campaign’ in the 14th Global Communication Conclave organised by Public Relations Council of India (PRCI) organised on 6 and 7 March at Bengaluru.

References

 Rourkela Steel Plan at wikimapia

External links
 Rourkela Steel Plan, website
 SAIL Home page
 ‘Mini India’ Rourkela coming alive through flickers of images
Rourkela – The Illustrated Journey Into The Life Of The City Around India's First Public Sector Steel Plant 

Steel Authority of India
Steel plants of India
Rourkela
Economy of Odisha
1955 establishments in Orissa
Buildings and structures in Odisha